Titanic is a 1997 American epic romance and disaster film directed, written, co-produced, and co-edited by James Cameron. Incorporating both historical and fictionalized aspects, it is based on accounts of the sinking of the Titanic, and stars Leonardo DiCaprio and Kate Winslet as members of different social classes who fall in love aboard the ship during its ill-fated maiden voyage.

Titanic grossed a worldwide total of over $2.2 billion on a production budget of $200 million, being the first and second film to reach the mark of one and two billion dollars, respectively. It became the highest-grossing film of all time in 1998, and remained so for twelve years, until Avatar (2009), also written and directed by Cameron, surpassed it in 2010. On review aggregator website Rotten Tomatoes, the film has an approval rating of 87% based on 237 reviews, with an average rating of 8/10. The site's critical consensus reads, "A mostly unqualified triumph for James Cameron, who offers a dizzying blend of spectacular visuals and old-fashioned melodrama." Metacritic, which assigned a weighted average rating of 75 out of 100, based on 35 critics, reports the film has "generally favorable reviews". Audiences polled by CinemaScore gave the film an average grade of "A+" on an A+ to F scale. In 2017, on its 20th anniversary, the film was selected for preservation in the United States National Film Registry by the Library of Congress as being "culturally, historically, or aesthetically significant".

At the 55th Golden Globe Awards, Titanic won in the categories of Best Motion Picture – Drama, Best Director, Best Original Score, and Best Original Song. DiCaprio, Winslet and Gloria Stuart were also nominated for their acting performances. At the 70th Academy Awards, the film garnered fourteen nominations, tying the record set in 1950 by Joseph L. Mankiewicz's All About Eve, with eleven wins: Best Picture (the second film about the Titanic to win that award, after 1933's Cavalcade), Best Director, Best Art Direction, Best Cinematography, Best Visual Effects, Best Film Editing, Best Costume Design, Best Sound, Best Sound Editing, Best Original Dramatic Score, and Best Original Song. Winslet, Stuart and the make-up artists were the three nominees that did not win. It was the second film to win eleven Academy Awards, after Ben-Hur (1959). It was also nominated for ten British Academy Film Awards, including Best Film and Best Director; it failed to win any. The film garnered a leading twelve nominations at the 2nd Golden Satellite Awards and more three in the 2005 edition, winning a total of eight awards, while Stuart won the Saturn Award for Best Supporting Actress. Other recognitions came from numerous North American guilds, such as the American Society of Cinematographers, Art Directors Guild, Directors Guild of America, National Board of Review, Producers Guild of America, and the Screen Actors Guild.

After winning the Golden Globe and the Oscar for Best Original Song, "My Heart Will Go On" won all the awards that was nominated at the 41st Annual Grammy Awards, including Record of the Year, Song of the Year, and Best Song Written for a Motion Picture or for Television. Its soundtrack won the American Music Award for Favorite Soundtrack, the Brit Award for Soundtrack/Cast Recording, and the Billboard Music Award for Album of the Year and Soundtrack Album of the Year. They both also received nominations at the Juno Award. In addition to the awards, Titanic also earned ten Guinness World Records, including Most Expensive Film Produced and Highest Box Office Film Gross for a Drama.

Accolades

See also 
 1997 in film
 1997 in music

Notes

References

External links 
 

Lists of accolades by film
Titanic (1997 film)